The Diving competition in the 1997 Summer Universiade were held in the island of Sicily, Italy.

Medal overview

Medal table

References
 

1997 Summer Universiade
1997
1997 in diving